Mister World 2000 was the 3rd edition of the Mister World competition. It was held at the Crieff Hydro Hotel in Perthshire, Scotland on October 13, 2000. Sandro Finoglio of Venezuela crowned Ignacio Kliche of Uruguay at the end of the event.

Results

Placements

Contestants

References

Mister World
2000 beauty pageants
2000 in Scotland
Beauty pageants in Scotland